Rhitymna is a genus of huntsman spiders described in 1897 by Eugène Simon. Members of this genus can be distinguished by a number of characteristics, but it is most often confused with Olios species, many of which also have the Y-shaped pattern on the dorsal opisthosoma.

Species
, Rhitymna comprises 21 species:

Rhitymna ambae Jäger, 2003 -  Indonesia (Java)
Rhitymna bicolana (Barrion & Litsinger, 1995) - Philippines
Rhitymna cursor (Thorell, 1894) - Singapore, Indonesia (Java)
Rhitymna deelemanae Jäger, 2003 - Indonesia (Bali, Sumba)
Rhitymna flava Schmidt & Krause, 1994 - Comoros
Rhitymna flores Jäger, 2019 - Indonesia (Flores)
Rhitymna gerdmangel Jäger, 2019 - Thailand, Malaysia
Rhitymna imerinensis (Vinson, 1863) - Madagascar     
Rhitymna kananggar Jäger, 2003 - Indonesia (Sumba)
Rhitymna macilenta Quan & Liu, 2012 - China (Hainan)
Rhitymna merianae Jäger, 2019 - Indonesia (Bali)
Rhitymna occidentalis Jäger, 2003 - Sri Lanka
Rhitymna pinangensis (Thorell, 1891) - Thailand, Malaysia, Indonesia (Sumatra, Borneo, Java)
Rhitymna plana Jäger, 2003 - Laos, Vietnam, Cambodia
Rhitymna pseudokumanga (Barrion & Litsinger, 1995) - Philippines     
Rhitymna senckenbergi Jäger, 2019 - Philippines (Negros)
Rhitymna simplex Jäger, 2003 - Malaysia (Borneo)
Rhitymna tangi Quan & Liu, 2012 - China (Hainan), Laos
Rhitymna tuhodnigra (Barrion & Litsinger, 1995) - Philippines
Rhitymna verruca (Wang, 1991) - China, Laos, Vietnam, Thailand
Rhitymna xanthopus Simon, 1901 - Malaysia

References

Sparassidae
Araneomorphae genera
Spiders of Africa
Spiders of Asia